Mallbackens IF is a football club from Mallbacken, 15 kilometres north of Sunne in Värmland, Sweden. The club was established in 1942 and played in the Women's premier division (Damallsvenskan) for the first time in 1986. They currently play in Sweden's second division, the Elitettan.

The club play their home games at Strandvallen Stadium in Mallbacken. The team colours are green and white. The club is affiliated to the Värmlands Fotbollförbund.

Current squad

Footnotes

External links
 Mallbackens IF – Official website 

 
Women's football clubs in Sweden
Football clubs in Värmland County
1942 establishments in Sweden
Damallsvenskan teams
Association football clubs established in 1942